Gary Wade Finley Jr. (1960–2022) was a multiple time champion at Huntsville (AL) Speedway.  Finley won the 1989 NASCAR Charlotte/Daytona Dash Series championship. Finley won the Daytona 200 event that year for the series.

Finley competed in one ARCA Racing Series race in 1984. He finished 7th. He also competed in two NASCAR Southeast Series events in 1993.

Gary Wade Finley Jr. arrived at Nashville Speedway USA in 1999 to compete in the NASCAR SuperTruck division at Nashville Speedway USA. The speedway was promoted by Alabama's Bob Harmon. Finley at season end claimed the rookie title and the championship title for the 1999 season.

Gary Wade Finley Jr. was married to Misty Rose Finley and for the 2016 season heads up the teams of his two sons. Garrett Finley currently driving the open wheel modified division and actively competes at Huntsville (AL) Speedway. The younger son Austin, competes at Fairgrounds Speedway Nashville in the limited late model division. The 2016 season was his rookie season. 

Gary Wade Finley Jr. died at his home in Toney, Alabama on November 6, 2022.

References

External links
 

1960 births
2022 deaths
NASCAR drivers
ARCA Menards Series drivers
Sportspeople from Huntsville, Alabama